The Worcester Warriors were a professional ice hockey team located in Worcester, Massachusetts. They played 2 seasons from 1954–1956, the first year in the Eastern Hockey League and the second in the Atlantic Hockey League. The city is now home to the Worcester Railers HC of the ECHL.

External links 
1954-55 Worcester Warriors, EHL Roster
1954-55 Final Standings, EHL
All-time roster for the Worcester Warriors in the Atlantic Hockey League

1954 establishments in Massachusetts
1956 disestablishments in Massachusetts
Eastern Hockey League teams
Defunct ice hockey teams in the United States
Defunct sports teams in Massachusetts
Ice hockey teams in Worcester, Massachusetts
Ice hockey clubs established in 1954
Sports clubs disestablished in 1956